The LG G Watch (model W100, codenamed Dory) is an Android Wear-based smartwatch announced and released by LG and Google on June 25, 2014. It was released along with the Samsung Gear Live as launch devices for Android Wear, a modified version of Android designed specifically for smartwatches and other wearables. It is compatible with all smartphones running Android 4.3 or higher that support Bluetooth LE. 

G Watch is, as of June 2014, only available in the United States and Canada at US$229 or in the United Kingdom for £159 on the Google Play Store. As of July 2014 the G Watch was also made available in Australia, France, Germany, India, Ireland, Italy, Japan, South Korea, and Spain.

The G Watch R is a variant featuring a round face and an OLED screen.

Hardware
The G Watch has IP67 certification for dust and water resistance. It has a user-replaceable buckle-based strap. The watch has no buttons. 
It uses an always-on rectangular shaped display.

Software
The G Watch runs Android Wear, which features a notification system based on Google Now technology that enables it to receive spoken commands from the user. Users may also install the open-source AsteroidOS or PostmarketOS.

Reception
JR Raphael of Computerworld liked the LG G Watch's superior dimmed-mode display, comfortable band, and easy-to-use charging cradle, but did not like the uninspired design and poor outdoor visibility display compared to Samsung Gear Live.

See also
 Wearable computer
 Moto 360

References

External links

 

Android (operating system) devices
Products introduced in 2014
Wear OS devices
Smartwatches
LG Electronics products